Colchester is a town in New London County, Connecticut, United States.  The population was 15,555 at the 2020 census. In 2010 Colchester became the first town in Connecticut, and the 36th in the country, to be certified with the National Wildlife Federation as a Community Wildlife Habitat.

The villages of Westchester and North Westchester are located within Colchester. The town center village, which was previously incorporated as a borough, is a census-designated place, with a population of 4,700 at the 2020 census.

The Colchester area was part of the Mohegan territory at the time of European settlement. Several members of the Paugussett tribe currently reside in Colchester, where the tribe (which also has a heritage property in Trumbull) has a larger more recently acquired second  reservation.

The Colchester Historical Society operates a local history museum in town.

History

Pre-Township and Becoming a Township 
On March 31, 1661, the original settlement of Colchester, was founded by Jeremy Adams upon a 340-acre area of land known as "Jerimiah's Farme".  The land was given to Jeremy, by Uncas, Sachem of the Mohegan tribe.

Colchester's land stayed under the ownership of Jeremy Adams and was not incorporated into any new county in 1666 (when Connecticut's first counties were created) this is likely because of the closeness between both Hartford County and New London County. Colchester was mainly a farming community with Jeremy Adams raising cattle within the town. The abundance of farms in early Colchester is the reason Colchester is "A Right To Farm Community" in the present day. Colchester stayed as a farming community not within a county's borders until 1698.

On October 13, 1698, Michael Taintor II, Samuel Northam and Nathaniel Foote III applied to go forth and settle the Town. Jerimiah's Farme was selected as the main point of reference for the town, with its north boundary as the Twenty Mile River. The southern side is bordered by Lyme. The west boundary meets the east bounds of Middletown and Haddam. The east and northeast boundary run to the bounds of Lebanon and Norwich. During the initial settlement, the area was also referred to as the Plantation of the Twenty-mile River.

On May 11, 1699, the town's principal founders, Nathaniel Foote, Samuel Northam and Michael Taintor asked the general court of Hartford for assistance with persons hindering the advancement of the settlement (Saybrook residents specifically), to be transferred under the jurisdiction of the New London colony, and for the Town to be recognized as Colchester. On May 11, 1699 the town name was named and incorporated into the colony of New London. After Colchester Officially became a town the land was divided among the original settlers and their ancestors. The town is said to be named after Colchester, a borough and port in Essex, England, where many colonists had emigrated from, most notably, where Nathaniel's grandfather Nathaniel Foote was born.

The 1700s 
Nathaniel Foote and his family were some of the first to settle here and finished building their house in 1702. The house began construction in 1699 by Nathaniel Foote III and was then finished by his son Nathaniel Foote IV. On November 29, 1703, a saw and grist mill were voted to be built by Israel and Samual Wyatt if they promised to maintain the mill for the town's use. The first schoolmaster began operations in 1705, and a schoolhouse was finished in 1711. In 1707 or earlier, a cemetery was built behind where Bacon Academy would later be built. The cemetery later held people like Reverend John Bulkeley, Dr. John Watrous, Pierpont Bacon, and his wife, Abigail Bacon. In 1708 Colchester re-joined Hartford county, and a second religious meeting house was built. On December 31, 1712, at a legal town meeting held in Colchester, Capt Gilbert Wyatt and Mr. Darnell Clark were Chosen, Selectmen. On December 28, 1713, Samuel Northam, Thomas Day, and Ebenezer Colman were chosen for a school committee ensuing year.

At a town meeting on June 12, 1716, it was voted to finish the schoolhouse where the foundation of the said house was the only partly standing. The selectmen Committee for the school has agreed with Nathaniel Loomis Jr. (He and his family are from Windsor) to keep school for twelve months and give him twenty-five pounds and ten shillings. He began to keep building the school. On December 8, 1729, Ensign Foote, Ensign Wells, and Israel Newton were chosen as Selectmen. The constables were selected at the same meeting, being Joseph Chamberlain and Isaac Jones. On June 3, 1774, Stephen Goodwin wrote to the Hartford Courant that he had a runaway slave. The slave was named Jefferey and rode away on horseback. A reward was said to be given out if said horse or Jefferey was found (6 dollars for Jeffery and 4 for the horse).

In 1756 Colchester's population was 2,300 people. In 1761 Michael Taintor built Taintors Farm, which stayed in the family until the early 20th century. The Nathaniel Hayward house was built in 1775 for Dudley Wright; The house was lived in by Dr. John Watrous and his wife (who was Dudley Wright's daughter). The house was later sold in 1848 and lived in by Nathaniel Hayward. The lawn of this house was the original town green. In 1777 Breed's Tavern was built, which is most known for being one of the two remaining sites associated with the Wooster Masonic Lodge. In 1782 Colchester had 3,300 inhabitants. Several men went into the revolutionary war, many of them died. One of which was Ephraim Little Jr., son of the 2nd Reverend of Colchester. In 1783 Colchester rejoined New London County after being within Hartford County. On Thursday, January 29, 1784, Congress suggested a tax, and the representatives of Colchester (Capt. Buckley and Col. Worthington) voted not to have it go into effect. In 1785 the Foote Family house was built by Nathaniel Foote and was lived in by his family. The Henry Champion House was built in 1790 by architect William Sprat. for Colonel Henry Champion who was active in the revolution and a military figure.

A list of the freemen of the town 
of Colchester in 1730 — Michael Taintor, Michael Taintor Junior, James Newton, Samuel Northam, Thorn Day, Richard Carrier, Ebeneezer Skinner, Daniel Clark, Daniel Clark Junior, Israel Wyatt, Decon Loomis, Wm Roberts, Nathaniel Loomis, Josh Wright, Josiah Gillet, Josiah Gillet Junior, Ebeneezer Dibell, Capt Gilbert John Adams, John Adams Junior, Decon Skiner, Richard Skinner, Nathaniel Skinner, Benjamin Skinner, Josh Prat, Nathaniell Kellogg, Ephrem Foot, Jos Pumery, Thorn Brown, Noah Wells, Josh Chamberlin, Josiah Foote, James Mun, Ensign John Skinner, Ebeneezer Kellogg, James Brown, Andrew Carrier, Richard Church, Mr Bulkley John Day, Jonathan Gillet, Jonathan Kellogg, Nathaniel Foote, Ebeneezer Coleman, Charles Williams, Clement Cithophell, John Chapman, Senior Ephream Wells, Josiah Phelps, John Holms, William Roberts, Josiah Gates, Joseph Foote and John Johnson

The 1800s 
On 13 Oct 1803 the town of Marlborough, Hartford County was created from parts of the towns of Colchester, Glastonbury, Hartford County, and Hebron, Tolland County. In the 1807 election for governor of Connecticut, Colchester voted 105 for Trumbull and 12 for Hart, a majority for Trumbull. On May 27, 1807, heavy cattle losses were reported because of stray dogs biting them. The following year (1808), Colchester voted for Trumbull’s re-election (135 to 24). In 1810 Colchester voted for the governor, 82 for Treadwell, 61 for Griswold, and 16 for Spalding. On March 6th, 1821, John Turner sold the southern green to Bacon Academy Trustees for $100 ($2,800 in 2018). A hatter came in 1828. In 1836, a town description was written in "Connecticut Historical Collections" stating that excellent quality iron ore was found. Colchester was hilly and stony in some parts of town. Hebron’s furnaces later used the ore in 1899. In "Connecticut Historical Collections" the school for colored children is mentioned; considering this book was released in 1836, the school could not have been more than 43 years old. Unbeknownst to John Barber (the writer of this book), he got to see it only four years before its ending. On August 8, 1844, Special Park Committee meeting reported costs to acquire 3 ½ acres of land plus costs of posts and rails to line the perimeter for $398 (about $13,000).  

In March 1850, The borough petitioned for a special meeting for land donation by Nathaniel Hayward. His proposal was a donation of land if the borough laid a tax of $1,000 to defray expenses of fences and grading land (about $32,000). The proposal was approved. In 1851 Work was completed for the new Town Park. The borough passes ordinances to ban cows from the park. Borough records showed the town immediately designated the park as a source of income. This included land rental for circus, shows, and sales of grasses and hay.

Colchester Bank 
The first known mention of the bank, was on June 19, 1856, when the Senate agreed to pass a bill incorporating the bank. On October 11, 1856, the bank's stockholders met and decided on a board of directors. They are as follows, Albert B. Isham, Stephen Brainard Day (Isaac's Buell's brother), William G. Buell, and Samuel F. Jones Jr. (who would later be the main accomplice in the Colchester bank scandal). In the same meeting, Isaac Biglow Buell (the cousin of Harvey Post Buell, a successful druggist, and pharmacist in Colchester) was chosen as president. The bank reportedly began the same day.

The 2000s 
In July 2005, Colchester was named by CNN's Money Magazine, the 57th best place in the U.S. to live in and is celebrated every year with a festival on the last Saturday of September called 57 Fest.

Geography
Among the many waterways are the Salmon River, Jeremy River, and Dickinson Creek, which is spanned by the Lyman Viaduct.

Principal communities
Colchester center
Golden Hill Paugussett Reservation
North Westchester
Westchester

Climate
This climatic region is typified by large seasonal temperature differences, with warm to hot (and often humid) summers and cold (sometimes severely cold) winters.  According to the Köppen Climate Classification system, Colchester has a humid continental climate, abbreviated "Dfb" on climate maps.

Activities 
The Salmon River State Forest provides opportunities for fishing, hiking, and hunting.

Landmarks 

Formerly an incorporated borough, the town center of Colchester is listed on the National Register of Historic Places as a historic district, known as the Colchester Village Historic District. The walkable center includes a town green with a veterans' memorial. Retail stores and restaurants are located here.

Schools
Colchester has four schools: Colchester Elementary School (Pre K-2), Jack Jackter Intermediate School (Grades 3–5), William J. Johnston Middle School (Grades 6–8), Bacon Academy (Grades 9–12).

Demographics

As of the census of 2000, there were 14,551 people, 5,225 households, and 3,997 families residing in the town. The racial makeup of the town was 94.53% White, 2.37% African American, 0.42% Native American, 0.60% Asian, 0.01% Pacific Islander, 0.75% from other races, and 1.32% from two or more races. Hispanic or Latino of any race were 1.92% of the population.

There were 5,225 households, out of which 43.0% had children under the age of 18 living with them, 63.9% were married couples living together, 9.2% had a female householder with no husband present, and 23.5% were non-families. 18.2% of all households were made up of individuals, and 5.9% had someone living alone who was 65 years of age or older.  The average household size was 2.75 and the average family size was 3.14.

In the town, the population was spread out, with 29.8% under the age of 18, 4.8% from 18 to 24, 36.5% from 25 to 44, 19.7% from 45 to 64, and 9.2% who were 65 years of age or older.  The median age was 35 years. For every 100 females, there were 94.4 males.  For every 100 females age 18 and over, there were 92.3 males.

The median income for a household in the town was $64,807, and the median income for a family was $62,346. Males had a median income of $47,123 versus $29,250 for females. The per capita income for the town was $24,038.  About 6.1% of families and 2.7% of the population were below the poverty line, including 1.6% of those under age 18 and 4.5% of those age 65 or over.

Notable people

 John Adams (1772–1863), founder of Phillips Exeter Academy, was the principal of the Bacon Academy here from 1803 to 1810
 William Adams (1807–1880), born in Colchester, noted clergyman and president of Union Theological Seminary (New York)
 Stephen F. Austin (1793–1836), "Father of Texas", attended Bacon Academy in 1803
 Edward Sheffield Bartholomew (1822–1858), sculptor
 Jehiel C. Beman (1791–1858) African-American 19th-century minister and abolitionist; born in Colchester
 Eliphalet Adams Bulkeley (1803–1872), Bacon Academy graduate (1819), state senator, state's attorney and founder of Aetna Insurance Company (1846)
 Jonathan Coulton (born 1970), singer-songwriter
 John B. Day (1847-1925), tobacco merchant and first owner of the New York Giants baseball team
 Rick Derringer (born 1947), rock artist and producer
 Henry C. Deming (1815–1872), mayor of Hartford, mayor of New Orleans, colonel in the Union Army and U.S. congressman
 Alfred Ely (1815–1892), US congressman of New York and taken prisoner after the First Battle of Bull Run
 Ezra Hall Gillett (1823–1875), author, clergyman, and professor
 Nathaniel Hayward (1808–1865), Inventor, Business Owner
 Prince Saunders (1775–1839), attorney general of the Republic of Haiti
 Lyman Trumbull (1813–1896), born in Colchester, Bacon Academy graduate (1829), became influential as a U.S. senator representing the state of Illinois during the Civil War and Reconstruction
 Abigail Goodrich Whittelsey (1788–1858), editor
 Denison Worthington (1806–1880), Wisconsin state senator
 Ron Wotus (born 1961), Bacon Academy graduate (1979), San Francisco Giants bench coach

References

Colchester Historical Society

External links

Town of Colchester official website

 
Towns in New London County, Connecticut
Towns in Connecticut